George Smoker (30 December 1856 – 23 May 1925) was an English first-class cricketer.

Smoker represented Hampshire in two first-class matches in 1885, which was Hampshire's final season with first-class status until the 1895 County Championship. Smoker's debut for the county came against Marylebone Cricket Club, with his second and final first-class match coming against Derbyshire.

Smoker died in Alresford, Hampshire on 23 May 1925.

Family
Smoker's son Henry Smoker played first-class cricket for Hampshire and Minor Counties Championship matches for Cheshire. Henry also played football for Southampton, making two appearances for the club.

External links
George Smoker at Cricinfo
George Smoker at CricketArchive

1856 births
1925 deaths
People from the City of Winchester
English cricketers
Hampshire cricketers